The Human Rights and Constitutional Affairs Select Committee (Malay: Jawatankuasa Pilihan Khas Hak Asasi Manusia dan Hal Ehwal Perlembagaan) is one of many select committees of the Malaysian House of Representatives. It is among four new bipartisan parliamentary select committees announced by the Minister in the Prime Minister's Department in charge of legal affairs, Liew Vui Keong, on 17 October 2019 in an effort to improve the institutional system. The creation saw the portfolio of human rights being moved from the previous Rights and Gender Equality Select Committee, now known as the Gender Equality and Family Development Select Committee.

Membership

14th Parliament 
As of December 2019, the Committee's current members are as follows:

Chair of the Human Rights and Constitutional Affairs Select Committee

See also
 Parliamentary Committees of Malaysia

References 

Parliament of Malaysia
Committees of the Parliament of Malaysia
Committees of the Dewan Rakyat